Eden Township is one of twenty townships in Benton County, Iowa, USA.  As of the 2000 census, its population was 275.

History
Eden Township was founded in 1849.

Geography
According to the United States Census Bureau, Eden Township covers an area of 35.51 square miles (91.97 square kilometers).

Unincorporated towns
 Eden at 
(This list is based on USGS data and may include former settlements.)

Adjacent townships
 Taylor Township (north)
 Benton Township (northeast)
 Canton Township (east)
 Fremont Township (southeast)
 Eldorado Township (south)
 Union Township (southwest)
 Big Grove Township (west)
 Jackson Township (northwest)

Cemeteries
The township contains these two cemeteries: Bellar and First Eden.

Major highways
  U.S. Route 218

School districts
 Benton Community School District
 Vinton-Shellsburg Community School District

Political districts
 Iowa's 3rd congressional district
 State House District 39
 State Senate District 20

References
 United States Census Bureau 2007 TIGER/Line Shapefiles
 United States Board on Geographic Names (GNIS)
 United States National Atlas

External links
 US-Counties.com
 City-Data.com

Townships in Benton County, Iowa
Cedar Rapids, Iowa metropolitan area
Townships in Iowa
1849 establishments in Iowa
Populated places established in 1849